A by-election was held for the New South Wales Legislative Assembly electorate of Ashfield on 10 November 1900 because Bernhard Wise had been appointed to the Legislative Council.

Dates

Result

Bernhard Wise was appointed to the Legislative Council.

See also
Electoral results for the district of Ashfield
List of New South Wales state by-elections

Notes

References

1900 elections in Australia
New South Wales state by-elections
1900s in New South Wales